Ancylosis ianthemis is a species of snout moth in the genus Ancylosis. It was described by Edward Meyrick in 1887 and is known from Australia.

References

Moths described in 1887
ianthemis
Moths of Australia